Leo Francis Walsh (4 March 1900 – 25 April 1981) was an Australian rules footballer who played with St Kilda in the Victorian Football League (VFL).

Notes

External links 

1900 births
1981 deaths
Australian rules footballers from Melbourne
St Kilda Football Club players
People from Kensington, Victoria